In mathematics, particularly in algebra, an indeterminate equation is an equation for which there is more than one solution. Indeterminate equations cannot be solved uniquely. In fact, in some cases it might even have infinitely many solutions. Some of the prominent examples of indeterminate equations include:

Univariate polynomial equation:

which has multiple solutions for the variable  in the complex plane—unless it can be rewritten in the form .

Non-degenerate conic equation:

Pell's equation:

The equation of Pythagorean triples:

The equation of the Fermat–Catalan conjecture:

See also 
Indeterminate form
Indeterminate system
 Indeterminate (variable)
 Linear algebra

References 

Algebra